The Retropinnidae are a family of bony fishes that contains the Southern Hemisphere smelts and graylings. They are closely related to the northern smelts (Osmeridae), which they greatly resemble, but not to the northern graylings (Thymallus). Species from this family are only found in southeastern Australia and New Zealand. Although a few species are partly marine, most inhabit fresh or brackish water.

References 

 
Ray-finned fish families